Chen Zhongshi (3 August 1942 – 29 April 2016) was a Chinese author. He started writing prose in 1965 and finished his magnum opus White Deer Plain in 1993 (for which he won the Mao Dun Literature Prize in 1997). In 1979, he became a member of the Chinese Writers Association (which he at one point served as the association's vice chairman).

Biography
Chen was born in Xi'an, Shaanxi on 3 August 1942. After graduating from No. 34 High School of Xi'an in 1962, he got a teaching job in primary school and, after two years, became a senior high school teacher. In 1966, Chen joined the Chinese Communist Party. He was interested in literature and soon began devoting himself to a writing career.

Chen became the vice director of Culture Bureau of Baqiao District of Xi'an in 1980. He served as a member of the Writers Association of Shaanxi, becoming vice president in 1985 and chairman in 1993. Between 2001 and 2006, he was the vice president of the Chinese Writers Association.

Chen died on 29 April 2016 at the age of 73 in Xi'an.

Works

Short stories
Trust
Country
Early Summer
The courtyard of the Kangs

Novels
White Deer Plain()
White Deer Plain, which has a large following in China, as of 2016, had not been translated into English.

Reportage

References

1942 births
2016 deaths
Chinese male short story writers
Writers from Xi'an
People's Republic of China essayists
Mao Dun Literature Prize laureates
Chinese male novelists
People's Republic of China novelists
People's Republic of China short story writers
Short story writers from Shaanxi